Kessinger may refer to:
Persons
 Don Kessinger (born 1942), American former professional baseball player and manager
 Grae Kessinger (born 1997), American baseball player
 Kayla Kessinger (born 1993), American politician from West Virginia
 Keith Kessinger (born 1967), American former Major League Baseball player and coach
 Kent Kessinger (active from 1988), American football coach and former player

Organisations
 Kessinger Publishing